Malleswaram Ladies Association High School, is an all-girls school for day scholars in Bangalore, Karnataka, India.

Location

Malleswaram Ladies Association (MLA) High School is located on 14th cross, Malleswaram, between Margosa and Sampige roads.

Origins

During the reign of His Highness Late Sri. Krishnarajendra Wadiyar Bahadur, a few ladies of Malleswaram felt a need for the social development of women. These ladies set up the Malleswaram Ladies Association on 8 August 1927, the day of the statewide Silver Jubilee celebration of the reign of His Highness Late Sri. Krishnarajendra Wadiyar Bahadur. Initially, the association was a forum for fellowship and a center for talents and arts. In 1930, it blossomed into an educational institution. In the 1934, Mahatma Gandhi visited the institution and praised the efforts made by the Association for the upliftment of women. 

On 30 January 1956, the high school division was added to the institution. The first Head Mistress was the late Smt M.S. Jayamma. In 1959, the first batch of high school girls passed out of SSLC. The other notable teachers were Ramayya, Shamanna, Shantamma, Hemalatha, Sharadamma, Vinuthamma, Yamuna Bai, Seethamma, Alumelamma, Geethamani, Sundaramma, the Math teacher, Manjulamma the arts and crafts teacher & others. Earlier it was known as Mahila Sewa Samaja & later the name was changed to Rukkamma Raghavachar Vidya Mandir (RRVM School).

External links 
 Malleswaram Ladies Association High School Website

Girls' schools in Karnataka
Educational institutions established in 1927
High schools and secondary schools in Bangalore
1927 establishments in India